Ranoidea auae is a species of frog in the subfamily Pelodryadinae.
It is endemic to Papua New Guinea.
Its natural habitats are swamps, freshwater marshes, intermittent freshwater marshes, and canals and ditches.

References

 

auae
Amphibians of Papua New Guinea
Amphibians described in 2004
Taxonomy articles created by Polbot
Taxobox binomials not recognized by IUCN